The 2015 Bruhat Bengaluru Mahanagara Palike (Greater Bengaluru City Corporation) election was held on 22 April 2015 in all 198 Wards of Bangalore (Bengaluru).

Background 
The tenure of the BBMP was scheduled to end on 22 April 2015. A new election was necessary to elect new Corporators and Mayor by that time. The Government of Karnataka had the intention of trifurcating BBMP and hence not notified for the elections till 2015 March end. On 30 March 2015 Bharatiya Janata Party corporators B. Somashekar (Shakambarinagar Ward) and CK Ramamurthy (Pattabhiramanagar Ward) filed a writ petition to conduct elections before end of the tenure The court on 10 March 2015 ordered notices to the state government, the state election commission and BBMP on a petition from two corporators seeking directions to hold municipal polls on the expiry of the term of the BBMP Council. Justice BV Nagarathna sought to know from the government about the preparedness for the polls and whether the urban development department had finalised the roster (ward wise reservation for SC, ST, women and OBCs). The State Cabinet on 17 April 2015 decided to supersede Bruhat Bangalore Mahanagara Palike (BBMP) and a notification of the same was issued on 18 April 2015 to avoid conducting polls to the civic body in April 2015. But Ward reservation list was already published on 13 April 2015. If the State government supersedes the council before the end of the term, it gets six months’ time to hold elections to the civic body. The government was keen on dissolving the BBMP and replacing it with three corporations. The Rajendra Kataria Committee reported on various financial and administrative irregularities in floating of tenders, execution of civil works and failure to generate revenue through hoardings in the BBMP ruled by the Bharatiya Janata Party during the council's term from 2010 to 2015 and it was used as a weapon to supersede the civic body. The Cabinet also approved an amendment bill to constitute three new corporations replacing the BBMP. The Karnataka Municipal Corporation (Amendment) Bill, 2014, was planned to be tabled at the one-day special session of the state legislature on 20 April 2015. The government decided to summon the special session as its move to promulgate an ordinance but the same was stalled by Governor Vajubhai Vala stating that he was not satisfied with it. Amidst stiff opposition from both Bharatiya Janata Party and Janata Dal (Secular), Karnataka Legislative Assembly passed a bill to trifurcate Bruhat Bengaluru Mahanagara Palike, the city civic body, with a voice vote on 20 April 2015. Following this, many Pro Kannada organisations and Youth wing of Bharatiya Janata Party protested opposing Government's move to Trifurcate BBMP. After failing to get the Governor's assent for an ordinance on trifurcation of the city civic body, a one-day session of Karnataka legislature was convened to pass the Karnataka Municipal Corporations (Amendment) Bill 2015. Opposition maintained their stiff reservation to the government's attempt to trifurcate BBMP. But the time bill was introduced by Indian National Congress in the House to the time it was passed. They even walked into the well of the House and tore the copy of the bill as the procedures to pass the bill through voice vote were being conducted. As the House met for the day, Bharatiya Janata Party led by then Opposition Leader Jagadish Shettar demanded that the issue of crop damage due to unseasonal rains and hailstorms should be taken up first, but Speaker Kagodu Thimmappa wished that to be discussed later on. Opposition criticised the government for going ahead with the plan to trifurcate the city even when the committee constituted by it to study on the matter is yet to submit its final report. It called the government's act as an attempt to postpone BBMP elections, with fear of losing it. The division bench of the Karnataka High Court, too, refused to stay a single bench order to conduct the elections before 30 May 2015. The Karnataka High Court on 24 April 2015 put off elections to the city's Bruhat Bengaluru Mahanagara Palike (BBMP) civic body. Setting aside a single bench order, which directed the state election commission (SEC) to conduct the civic poll by May 30, a division bench headed by Chief Justice D.H. Waghela and Justice Ram Mohan Reddy told the state government to hold the elections by six months, as per the 74th constitutional amendment. The state government filed a review petition on April 7 seeking a stay on the March 30 order of Justice B.V. Nagarathna to the SEC for holding the civic poll by May 30, as its five-year term was ending on April 22. State advocate general Ravivarma Kumar assured the bench that the state government would abide by its order and facilitate the SEC to hold the civic election in 198 wards across the city within six months. The two original petitioners (CK Ramamurthy and B Somashekar), who were Bharatiya Janata Party (Bharatiya Janata Party) corporators in the dissolved BBMP, said they would approach the Supreme Court next week against the civic poll postponement. The state government sought more time to hold the civic poll on the grounds that delimitation of the wards, restructuring of the civic body and reservation in many wards as per the 2011 census were not completed for various reasons. The State government claimed that the trifurcation of the BBMP was necessary to deliver better services to the citizens while the Bharatiya Janata Party and the JD(S) oppose the move, stating that it is a ploy to postpone polls. G. Kumar Naik took charge as the 61st Commissioner of the Bruhat Bangalore Mahanagara Palike (BBMP) on 20 April 2015, two days after the state government issued an order on superseding BBMP. The Karnataka Congress government's bill to divide Bengaluru city into three or more smaller administrative units was passed by the state legislative assembly on 21 July 2015 after the legislative council, where the opposition Bharatiya Janata Party is in a majority, rejected the bill 20 July 2015. The Karnataka Municipal Corporations (Amendment) Bill 2015 had initially been passed by the state assembly on April 20, 2015 but was defeated by the council on 20 July 2015. The assembly where the Congress has a clear majority of 123 members in the 224 member house passed the bill again on 21 July 2015 to send it to Governor Vajubhai Vala for his assent. Under the proposed law the urban area of Bengaluru called the Bruhat Bengaluru Mahanagara Palike spread over 198 wards was proposed to cease and planned to be redrawn as smaller corporations. An expert committee on Restructuring of the Bruhat Bengaluru Mahanagara Palike (BBMP) in a report submitted to the state on 13 July 2015 recommended division of the BBMP into five municipal corporations with mayors to be directly elected by the people for the purpose of smooth administration, the report claimed. 
The passage of the new law was expected to buy the Congress government more time to conduct elections to the city council that had earlier been ordered by the high court and the Supreme Court after the Congress government dissolved the city council in April at the end of the elected council's tenure and took administrative control of the city. The Supreme Court's order brought certainty to the timeline for the BBMP elections after few months legal to's and fro's. The Court ordered extending the deadline for the completion of BBMP polls by August 28, 2015. Setting the process for the August 22 election of the Bruhat Bengaluru Mahanagara Palike (BBMP) in motion, The commissioner of BBMP, G Kumar Naik issued the notification on 3 August 2015. A calendar of events was released by Naik as an affirmation of the notification announcing the election dates issued by State Election Commissioner P N Srinivasachary on 16 July 2015.

Organization 
New Mayor will be elected for a term of one year and Corporators will be in office for 5 years

Schedule 
The schedule of the election was announced by the State Election Commission on 16 July 2015. It announced that polling would be held in a single phase on 22 August and that results would be declared on 25 August 2015. It also declared that the provisions of the Model Code of Conduct came into force with immediate effect" with the said announcement.

Candidates

By Community

Results

List of successful candidates

Results summary

By-elections

See also 
 Elections in Karnataka
 Bangalore Mahanagara Palike
 List of wards in Bangalore
 List of wards in Bangalore (1995-2006)
 List of wards in Bangalore (2010-2020)

References

2010s in Karnataka
2010s in Bangalore
Elections in Bangalore
2015 elections in India